Callow Rock quarry is a limestone quarry located in Shipham Gorge between Cheddar and Shipham on the Mendip Hills, Somerset, England.

The quarry has been operating since the early 20th century primarily as a Lime quarry producing a quality product of high purity for the chemical industry. It is now operated by Bardon Aggregates. In 1922 a plant was built to make hydrated lime. It also now contains a large concrete production plant.
Local residents driving past on Shipham Hill always know to be wary of treacherous driving conditions caused by mud on the road from quarry vehicle wheels.

See also 
 Quarries of the Mendip Hills

References

Quarries in the Mendip Hills
Cheddar, Somerset